Kacper Masiak (born 11 January 2005) is a Polish professional footballer who plays as an attacking midfielder for Zagłębie Lubin.

Career statistics

Club

Notes

References

External links

2005 births
People from Racibórz
Living people
Association football midfielders
Polish footballers
Poland youth international footballers
Zagłębie Lubin players
III liga players
II liga players
Ekstraklasa players